Laugel is a surname. Notable people with the surname include:

 Anselme Laugel (1851–1928), French-Alsatian author and politician
 Auguste Laugel (1830–1914), French historian and engineer
 Jonathan Laugel (born 1993), French rugby sevens player

See also
 Laurel (surname)